Willemetia  is a genus of flowering plants in the family Asteraceae. It is native to Europe, Iran and the Caucasus.

 Species
 Willemetia stipitata (Jacq.) Dalla Torre - Central Europe (France, Germany, Italy, Serbia, etc.)
 Willemetia tuberosa Fisch. & C.A.Mey. ex DC. - Iran, Caucasus

References

Cichorieae
Asteraceae genera
Taxa named by Noël Martin Joseph de Necker